Miritini is a suburb of Mombasa, Kenya. Located in the Changamwe Constituency, it had a population of 31,485 in data from 1999.

External links
Maplandia

Populated places in Coast Province
Mombasa County